This article is about American game show, For Philippine Television Documentary, See i-Witness

iWitness was an American game show created and co-produced by Judge Judy Sheindlin. It aired on Fox stations and in syndication on July 10, 2017 for a test run of six weeks.

Format

The main game is divided into three separate rounds. At the conclusion of the third round, the player with the most money keeps it and advances to the bonus round. If there is a tie for first place after the last question in round 3, the tiebreaker procedures are as follows: a question is asked, and then an eighth picture (with no monetary value) is shown based on the question.
 Round 1 - What Just Happened? – Two videos are shown, one at a time with Henson providing biographical info about each. After the clip plays, Henson poses questions about the videos. All questions are toss-ups but only up to two players can answer each question. Each question is worth $100.
 Round 2 - What Did We Change? – Only one video is shown and then seven altered stills from the video are presented. The contestants' job is to figure out what different about the picture. Each correct answer is worth $200. Each incorrect answer, however, deducts $100.
 Round 3: Don't Blink – In the final round, seven more pictures are presented and an A-B-C question (a multiple-choice question with the choices marked A, B, & C) is asked for each one. The three players lock in their answers simultaneously by pressing A, B or C on their podiums. The first question is worth $300 and goes up by $100 for each new question, finishing off at $900.

Bonus Round: Double Vision – Again, two videos are shown, only this time they are shown simultaneously (this includes both audio tracks being played at the same time). The videos are branded "Red" and "Blue" and the answers are always "Red", "Blue" or  "Neither".

The winning contestant has 30 seconds to score five points. Each correct answer scores a point while each incorrect answer loses a point. If the winning contestant can reach five points before time runs out, s/he wins $20,000. If the contestant fails, then they win no additional money.

References

External links
 

2017 American television series debuts
2010s American game shows
English-language television shows
Television series by Fremantle (company)